Yellow Fever is the sixth album by the American blues rock band Hot Tuna, recorded and released in 1975 as Grunt BFL1-1238. The album was also released in Quadraphonic as Grunt BFD1-1238. The album rose to #97 on the Billboard charts.

Track listing

Personnel
Jorma Kaukonen – vocals, guitars
Jack Casady – bass
Bob Steeler – drums

Additional Personnel
Nick Buck – synthesizer on "Bar Room Crystal Ball"
John Sherman – 2nd guitar on "Baby What You Want Me to Do"

Production
Hot Tuna – producer
Mallory Earl – producer, engineer
Pat Ieraci (Maurice) – production coordinator
Steve Malcolm – assistant engineer
Michael Casady – equipment
Bill Thompson – manager
Acy Lehman – art direction
Gribbitt – design
Mick Haggerty – illustration
Recorded and Mixed at Wally Heider Studios, San Francisco
Mastered by Rick Collins, Kendun Recorders, Burbank

References

Hot Tuna albums
1975 albums
Albums recorded at Wally Heider Studios
Grunt Records albums